Kunlong Township is a township of Lashio District (formerly part of Kunlong District) in Shan State, Burma. The main town is Kunlong, located by the Salween River.

Further reading
 Myanmar States/Divisions & Townships Overview Map

References

Townships of Shan State